"Cuckoo" is the third single from Catching a Tiger, American folk rock singer Lissie's debut album. It was released on August 30, 2010 for digital download, it reached number 81 in the UK.

Track listing

Chart performance
Cuckoo managed to peak to number 81 on the UK Singles Chart.

Release history

References 

2010 singles
Songs written by Julian Emery
2010 songs
Songs written by Jim Irvin
Sony Music singles